Suitte d'un Goût Étranger is a composition for bass viola da gamba and continuo by Marin Marais.

Origins 
The Suite in a Foreign Style was included in Marin Marais's Livre IV of pieces for viol and continuo, and which also included the pieces for three viols, which Marais referred to in the Avertissement as 'a completely new departure in France.' The first suites in Livre IV are charming and simple and closely resemble Livre III, where Marais had endeavored to present pieces of an easy and accessible nature for the less proficient players. However, these suites are followed immediately by the Suitte d'un Goût Étranger, which is famous for its technical and musical demands.

Style 
The suite is remarkable in many aspects. For one, in it Marais did away with conventional forms and structures and instead presented the public with a collection of what are essentially pièces de charactère, a clear departure from his previous suites which were built around the typical dance forms preferred and upheld by his contemporaries. The thirty-three pieces are arranged by keys, but not as separate suites in the traditional sense. Rather, they are a succession of small groups of pieces in thirteen different keys . In addition to this formal and structural iconoclasm, the suite is filled with music that is supremely virtuosic, descriptive, and adventurous—both melodically and harmonically . 

One might expect that, in an effort to 'fill in' Livre IV, Marais inserted some especially difficult or highly favored pieces that he had been saving, and put them all into their own suite. It might also be postulated that Marais was responding to the French penchant for highly descriptive and idiomatic orchestral music—a tradition upheld by the likes of Jean-Philippe Rameau and Jean-Féry Rebel—with virtuosic chamber music, as opposed to his earlier works which mimic the older generation of French Baroque composers.

The Suitte also bears some resemblance to François Couperin's intimate style cultivated in his music for the harpsichord. In any case, the Suitte d'un Goût Étranger with all of its garish flair and supreme elegance, might be viewed as a culmination in French Baroque chamber music.

Contents 
 Marche Tartare (March of the Tartars)
 Allemande
 Sarabande
 La Tartarine (The Tartar Girl)
 Double (of La Tartarine)
 Gavotte
 Feste Champêtre (Rustic Festival)
 Gigue la Fleselle
 Rondeau le Bijou (The Jewel)
 Le Tourbillon (The Whirlwind)
 L'Uniforme (The Uniform)
 Suitte (with L'Uniforme)
 Suitte (with L'Uniforme)
 L'Ameriquaine (The American)
 Allemande (Sujet) & Gigue (Basse)—contained in one piece, the soloist plays an Allemande before switching parts with the continuo, transforming it into a Gigue.
 Allemande L'Asmatique (The Asthmatic)
 La Tourneuse (The Spinner)
 Muzette
 Caprice ou Sonate
 Le Labyrinthe (The Labyrinth)
 La Sauterelle (The Grasshopper)
 La Fougade
 Allemande La Bizarre
 La Minaudière (The Affected)
 Allemande La Singulière
 L'Arabesque
 Allemande La Superbe
 La Rêveuse (The Dreaming Girl)
 Marche
 Gigue
 Pièce Luthée (Piece in a lute style)
 Gigue La Caustique (The Caustic)
 Le Badinage (The Banter)

References

Compositions by Marin Marais
Compositions for viol
Suites (music)